Acoustic Archives is an acoustic compilation album by the American Christian metal band Tourniquet. It was released in 1998. Nearly all the songs are from previous releases and performed acoustically, with the exception of the new song "Trivializing the Momentous, Complicating the Obvious".

Track listing

 appears on The Epic Tracks (2019)

Personnel

Tourniquet
Ted Kirkpatrick – drums, percussion
Luke Easter – vocals
Aaron Guerra – guitar, vocals
Vince Dennis – bass guitar, vocals

Additional personnel
Produced by Bill Metoyer and Tourniquet
Mastered by Eddy Schreyer at Oasis Mastering in Studio City, California
Guitar setup and intonation by Eric Chaz
Original watercolor cover painting by Alison Schroeer

References

External links
Acoustic Archives at Tourniquet.net

Tourniquet (band) albums
1998 albums